Moses Kimhi (c. 1127 – c. 1190), also known as the ReMaK, was a medieval Jewish biblical commentator and grammarian.

Birth and early life
Kimhi was born around 1127, the eldest son of Joseph Kimhi and the brother of David Kimhi, known as the RaDaK. He was born and lived in Hachmei Provence in Occitania, an area that was heavily under the influence of the Sephardic community of that time. Little else is known of his early life.

Adulthood
He apparently raised his younger brother David following the death of their father, and was a major influence in his commentaries.

Career as a commentator
Like his father, he wrote a number of commentaries on the Bible, basing himself on the literal meaning of the text. His surviving works include commentaries on the books of Proverbs, Job, Ezra, and Nehemiah. He also wrote a book of essays on Hebrew grammar, in which he described the underlying principles of his commentaries, combined with tangential discussions of medieval philosophy.

References

Provençal Jews
12th-century French rabbis
Bible commentators
1120s births
1190 deaths
Year of birth uncertain